Zied Berrima (born 4 September 2001) is a Tunisian professional footballer who plays as a forward for Espérance de Tunis.

Career 
Berrima grew up in the academy Espérance de Tunis where he was considered to be one of their most talented young players. He signed his first professional contract on 1 August 2018.

Having trained with the first squad since 2018, he made his professional debuts on 15 January 2019 against the US Ben Guerdane in Ligue I.

Honours 
ES Tunis
 Tunisian Ligue I: 2019
 CAF Champions League: 2019

References

External links 
 
 

2001 births
Living people
Tunisian footballers
Association football forwards
Espérance Sportive de Tunis players
Tunisia youth international footballers